Amélie Lacoste (born December 17, 1988) is a Canadian former competitive figure skater. She is the 2010 Skate Canada International bronze medallist and the 2012 Canadian national champion. Her highest placement at an ISU Championship was 7th at the 2010 and 2012 Four Continents Championships.

Career 

Lacoste won the novice national title in 2003 and the junior national title in 2005. She also competed on the Junior Grand Prix series. She finished 5th in her senior national debut at the 2006 Canadian Championships. She briefly tried pair skating in 2007.

Lacoste won the bronze medal at the 2009 Canadian Championships. She was assigned to her first Four Continents Championships where she finished 10th. The following season, she made her Grand Prix debut, appearing at 2009 Skate Canada International and 2009 Cup of Russia. She finished 7th at the 2010 Four Continents.

Lacoste won the bronze at 2010 Skate Canada International and placed 5th at 2010 Skate America. She won a bronze medal at the 2011 Canadian Championships. She was named an alternate to the World Championships and was given her first berth to the event when Myriane Samson dropped out due to injury.

In 2012, Lacoste won the Canadian national title, defeating Cynthia Phaneuf by 1.57 points. Lacoste then earned a berth to her second World Championships when she placed 7th at the 2012 Four Continents, 0.18 ahead of Phaneuf. She finished 16th at the 2012 World Championships in Nice. Lacoste injured her right hip in autumn 2012.

In early October 2013, Lacoste moved to Colorado Springs, Colorado to be coached by Christy Krall and Damon Allen. She won the bronze medal at the 2014 Canadian Championships. In May 2014, she announced her retirement from competition.

Programs

Competitive highlights 
GP: Grand Prix; JGP: Junior Grand Prix

References

External links

 
 Amelie Lacoste at Skate Canada
 Amelie Lacoste at Tracings.net

1988 births
Living people
French Quebecers
Canadian female single skaters
Figure skaters from Montreal